Pierre Gautier (born 20 December 1946) is a French racing cyclist. He rode in the 1970 Tour de France.

References

External links
 

1946 births
Living people
French male cyclists
Place of birth missing (living people)